Bokermannohyla martinsi is a species of frogs in the family Hylidae. It is endemic to Brazil. Its natural habitats are moist savanna, subtropical or tropical moist shrubland, subtropical or tropical high-altitude shrubland, and rivers. It is threatened by habitat loss.

Etymology
The specific epithet martinsi is an homage to Brazilian entomologist Ubirajara Ribeiro Martins.

References

Bokermannohyla
Endemic fauna of Brazil
Amphibians described in 1964
Taxonomy articles created by Polbot